Edward Junius Black (October 30, 1806 – September 1, 1846) was a slave owner,  United States Representative and lawyer from Georgia. His son was U.S. Representative George Robison Black.

Born in Beaufort, South Carolina, in 1806, the elder Black graduated from the Richmond Academy in Augusta, Georgia, studied law, gained admittance to the state bar in 1827 and began practicing law in Augusta.

Black served in the Georgia House of Representatives from 1829 to 1831. He moved to Screven County, Georgia, in 1832; at that time, he married Augusta George Anna Kirkland, and greatly grew his slave ownership from a few slaves to "thirty or forty slaves," according to his son's later recollections.

In 1838, he was elected to the United States House of Representatives as a Whig to represent Georgia in the 26th United States Congress and served one term from March 4, 1839, until March 3, 1841, as he lost his reelection bid as a Democrat for a second term in that seat in 1840; however, he did win election as a Democrat to fill a vacancy in the 27th Congress caused by the resignations of Georgia Representatives Julius C. Alford, William Crosby Dawson and Eugenius Aristides Nisbet. He won reelection to that seat in the general election of 1842 and served in the 28th Congress and his second sting in the U.S. congress spanned from January 3, 1842, to March 3, 1845. Black lost his reelection bid in 1844 and returned to practicing law. He died on September 1, 1846, and was buried in a family cemetery near Millettville, South Carolina, in Allendale County.

References

1806 births
1846 deaths
People from Beaufort, South Carolina
American people of Scottish descent
Whig Party members of the United States House of Representatives from Georgia (U.S. state)
Democratic Party members of the United States House of Representatives from Georgia (U.S. state)
Democratic Party members of the Georgia House of Representatives
Politicians from Augusta, Georgia
Georgia (U.S. state) lawyers
American slave owners
19th-century American lawyers